Richard Deane Terrell  (born 22 April 1936) is an Australian econometrician and vigneron, was a Rhodes scholar (1959) and Vice-Chancellor of the Australian National University (1994–2001). Terrell's other positions, affiliations, and interests are diverse and numerous.

Early years
Terrell was born in Adelaide and educated at St Peter's College, Adelaide, the University of Adelaide, and was awarded a Rhodes Scholarship in 1959 where he studied for a PhD at Magdalen. Terrell completed his PhD in statistics at Australian National University in 1970.

Affiliations, etc.
Chairman, IELTS (Aust.) Pty Ltd (20022007)
Chairman, AARNet Pty Ltd (20022011)
Chairman, General Sir John Monash Foundation Investment Committee (2003)
Chairman, Board of the Sir Roland Wilson Foundation
Chairman, Selection Committee for the Sir Roland Wilson Scholarship Program
Chairman, Canberra Symphony Orchestra
CEO, Quarry Hill Wines (2000)
Member of the Advisory Board for the Centre for Arab and Islamic Studies
Member, General Sir John Monash Foundation and Scholarship Awards Committee

Personal
Terrell married Jennifer Anne Kathleen Doman in 1961; they have two sons and a daughter.

Honours and awards
Terrell is an Emeritus Professor at ANU, and was appointed an Officer of the Order of Australia (AO) in 2002 for service to higher education, particularly as a pioneer in establishing international links between Australian and overseas universities, as a leading contributor to organisations bridging the academic and business sectors, and as an administrator and educator.

References

External links

ANU Reporter, 17 November 1999
Launch of the Peace Scholarship Program, 13 November 2003, IDP Education Australia Limited
International English Language Testing System, IELTS Australia
Graduates relive golden memories, Summer 2010, Lumen, University of Adelaide
Man of the Month - July 2012, America's Registry of Outstanding Professionals
The General Sir John Monash Foundation

Living people
1936 births
Officers of the Order of Australia
Australian Rhodes Scholars
People from Adelaide
People educated at St Peter's College, Adelaide
University of Adelaide alumni
Academic staff of the Australian National University
Alumni of Magdalen College, Oxford
Australian National University alumni
Vice-Chancellors of the Australian National University